Chai Prakan, sometimes written as Chaiprakan, Chaiprakarn or Chaiprakhan, is home to the district headquarters of Chai Prakan District in the far north of Chiang Mai Province, Thailand. It lies 145 km from the city of Chiang Mai and 850 km from Bangkok. It is a popular location for vehicles to stop on the way to Doi Ang Khang, Fang, and Tha Ton.

The municipality covers the complete subdistrict Pong Tam and parts of the subdistricts Si Dong Yen and Nong Bua, all within Chai Prakan district.

History 
The historical Chai Prakan was founded in 973 as part of the Sinhanavati Kingdom but the city fell in 998. Chai Prakan archaeological site is in Fang District 12 km from the town of Fang. 

The current local government was established as a sanitary district in 1994. Like all sanitary districts, it was upgraded to a subdistrict municipality in 1999.

See also 
 Chai Prakan District

References

External links
http://www.chaiprakarn.go.th/ Website of municipality

Cities and towns in Thailand
Populated places in Chiang Mai province
Cities and towns in Chiang Mai province